Yotam Haber is a composer based in Kansas City. He is a 2005 Guggenheim fellow and a 2007 Rome Prize winner in Music Composition.

Biography
Yotam Haber was born October 27, 1976 in the Netherlands and grew up in Israel, Nigeria, and Milwaukee. He studied music composition at Indiana University with Eugene O'Brien and Claude Baker and then earned his doctorate at Cornell with Steven Stucky and Roberto Sierra. In 2013 Haber married visual artist Anna Schuleit.

Haber has written music for leading new music ensembles and performers including the Kronos Quartet, Alarm Will Sound, Gabriel Kahane, Flux Quartet, and The Knights (orchestra). He has been a fellow at the Aspen Music Festival and Tanglewood Music Festival, and artist colonies including MacDowell Colony, Yaddo, Aaron Copland House, Bogliasco Foundation, the Rockefeller Foundation's Bellagio Center, the Blue Mountain Center, and the Hermitage Artist Retreat.

Haber served as the artistic director of the MATA Festival from 2010 to 2014. His work at the MATA festival was lauded by The New York Times as "a testament to MATA’s enduring mission and to the high standards maintained by its current directors, David T. Little and Yotam Haber." During his final festival The New York Times further remarked "If there is one thing that sets the MATA Festival apart from many of the other contemporary-classical bounties New York regularly produces, it might be a robust international representation, which seems to have grown sharply since Yotam Haber — a Dutch-born global citizen and the festival’s artistic director from 2009 until this year — has been at the helm."

Recent major projects include a commission for a concert length work, A More Convenient Season, for the Alabama Symphony Orchestra with chorus and soloists commemorating the 50th anniversary of an explosion that killed four in a Baptist church in Birmingham on September 15, 1963. In 2015, Haber's first monographic album of chamber music, Torus, was released on Roven Records and distributed by Naxos to wide critical acclaim, hailed by New York's WQXR as "a snapshot of a soul in flux – moving from life to the afterlife, from Israel to New Orleans – a composer looking for a sound and finding something powerful along the way." In 2015 he was commissioned by the Kronos Quartet and Carnegie Hall for the 50 For the Future Project to write break_break_break for string quartet and electronics (electronics by Philip White).

Haber's music has been well received, called "haunting" by New Yorker critic Alex Ross and The New York Times. The New York Times called Haber's From the Book of Maintenance and Sustenance "Alluring" and "Engaging" adding that "Mr. Haber used the soulful lower register of the viola to expressive effect, and its higher register to create intriguing timbres. Fluttering trills unfolded over lone piano notes; bell-like descending piano chords were echoed by gently ascending viola motifs. The piece faded to an enigmatic whisper at the end." Haber was hailed by the Los Angeles Times as one of five classical musicians "2014 Faces To Watch,”  and chosen as one of the “30 composers under 40” by Orpheus Chamber Orchestra's Project 440.

Selected works
 LAST SKIN for 8 retuned violins
 We Were All for Sinfonietta
 I AM for Chorus and String Quartet
 On Leaving Brooklyn for Chorus, solo voices, and Violin
 New Ghetto Music for full orchestra, voice, and field recordings of Roman cantors from 1950 to 1960
 between composure and seduction for baroque violin, double bass, percussion
 Hvem er Det (who is it) for two sopranos and mezzo-soprano
 A Wine Dark Sea for string orchestra (commissioned by The Knights Ensemble)
 death will come and she shall have your eyes for string orchestra, voice, field recordings of Roman cantors from 1940 to 1960
 Espresso for Wind Ensemble
 Purity Guaranteed for violin and flute
 Death in Venice for solo trumpet
 The Little Bird Concerto for Nicolet Orchestra

Awards
2021 The Benjamin Danks Award from the American Academy of Arts and Letters
2020 The Azrieli Commission for Jewish Music
2016 DAAD Artists-in-Berlin Program Grant 
2016 MAP Fund for New Water Music, performed by the Louisiana Philharmonic Orchestra and 100 volunteer community musicians 
2013 Fromm Foundation Commission 
2013 New York Foundation for the Arts Fellow 
2007 Rome Prize
2005 Guggenheim Fellowship
2004 ASCAP/CBDNA Frederick Fennell Competition
2002, 2004 ASCAP Morton Gould Award

References

External links
 http://www.YotamHaber.com
 http://www.thedaysofyore.com/yotam_haber/
 http://www.wqxr.org/#!/people/yotam-haber/
 http://seriousmusicmedia.com/?page_id=1831

American male composers
21st-century American composers
Aspen Music Festival and School alumni
Living people
21st-century American male musicians
Year of birth missing (living people)